Lalru railway station is a railway station in Sahibzada Ajit Singh Nagar district in the Indian state of Punjab on the Northern Railways network.  Its code is LLU. It serves Lalru town. The station consists of two platforms. The platforms are not well sheltered. It lacks many facilities, including water and sanitation. It is a small station which is visited by about seven passenger trains.

Trains 

Some of the trains that run from Lalru are:

 Ambala–Nangal Dam Passenger (unreserved)
 Kalka–Delhi Passenger (unreserved)
 Amb Andaura–Ambala DMU
 Kalka–Ambala Passenger (unreserved)
 Ambala–Kalka Shuttle (unreserved)

References

Ambala railway division
Railway stations in Sahibzada Ajit Singh Nagar district